Viśhva (Sanskrit:विश्व), root विश् ("vish") (to pervade) means all-pervading or omnipresent. It is another name for Vishnu and also refers to the world, the universe. In literature, this word refers to the entire enchanted universe.

Literature 
The word (विश्व) (vishva) appears in the Rig Veda, for example, Rishi Dirghatamas (R.V.I.146.1) states:-

 त्रिमूर्ध्दान सप्तरश्मिं गृणीषेऽनूनमग्निं पित्रोरूपस्थे |
 निषत्तमस्य चरतो ध्रुवस्य विश्वा दिवो रोचनापप्रिवांसम् ||

that just as the seven bright rays of the sun and the brightness of Agni light up the entire world of inanimate and animate objects, so do the learned people with their wisdom gracefully illuminate the minds of all beings for mutual benefits. The Shatapatha Brahmana (IX.iii.1.3–6) also uses this word as meaning All. In sloka XI.18 of the Bhagavad Gita, Arjuna describing the vision of the universal Purusha states – त्वमस्य विश्वस्य परं निधानम् – "you are the great treasure house of this Universe", in which phrase the compound-word विश्वस्य is read as – "of universe".

The significance of vishva in Hindu philosophy is revealed in the Upanishads. In the Āgama Prakarana of his Karika on the Mandukya Upanishad Gaudapada explains that in the three states of consciousness, the one and the same object of experience and the experiencer appears in three-fold forms (त्रिधा भोगं) as – विश्व  (vishva) ('gross'), तैजस  (taijasa) ('subtle') and प्राज्ञ  (prajna) ('the blissful'). He tells us that बहिष्प्रज्ञो विभुर्विश्वो Vishva is he who is all-pervading and who experiences the external (gross) objects but although moving in them is distinct from the witnessed states, दक्षिणाक्षिमुखे विश्वो he who cognizes in the right eye because the right eye is the means of perception of gross objects, विश्वो हि स्थूलभुङ्नित्यं who always experiences the gross (object), स्थूलं तर्पयते विश्वं and whom the gross (object) satisfies because it is in the waking state that the gross is perceived and experienced differently. He states that vishva the first among the three states and first in the three-lettered "aum" is "a" the means to cognize its all-pervasiveness, it pervades all thought and speech and makes even words lose their distinct identity in a harmonious whole like the whole which is like the ākāsha same everywhere. vishva, taijasa and prajna, these three padās ('quarters') which serve as means, are merged before the fourth, turiya, is realized. Purusha, related to all gross beings as their self, is called vaiśvānara because he leads all (vishva) men (nara); vaiśvānara is the self, the individual-cosmos-divinity triunity, the self revealed in the waking state. Thus, vishva which is bound to the cause and effect and therefore to duality is the outward oriented consciousness, taijasa which is also bound to cause and effect is the inward oriented consciousness and prajna which is bound to cause alone is the emmassed consciousness; all three are one though thought of as many, and can be experienced in the waking state.

Vishva is a pronominal adjective; "pronominal adjectives are a class of words which share in common with the real pronouns certain peculiarities of declension, affected only if used in certain sense". Vishva is in the group of adjectives which have masculine stems ending in short "a", and feminine stem ending in long "ā". The derivatives of pronominal stems – "ta"- which is demonstrative, "ya"- which is relative, and "ka"- which is interrogative, morph as comparative and superlative adjectives and serve as pronouns.

See also 

 Vishwa Guru

References

Vedanta
Forms of Vishnu
Hindu philosophical concepts